Sulpicia was the author, in the first century BCE, of six short poems (some 40 lines in all) written in Latin which were published as part of the corpus of Albius Tibullus's poetry (poems 3.13-18). She is one of the few female poets of ancient Rome whose work survives.

Life
Sulpicia lived in the reign of Augustus and was born around 40 BCE. She was the daughter of Servius Sulpicius Rufus and probably his wife Valeria; her uncle the brother of Valeria, Marcus Valerius Messalla Corvinus, an important patron of literature who also launched the career of Ovid. Sulpicia's family were well-off citizens with connections to Emperor Augustus, since her uncle Messalla served as the commander for Augustus.

Poetry
 Sulpicia's surviving work consists of six short elegiac poems (3.13–18), which have been preserved as part of a collection of poetry, book 3 of the Corpus Tibullianum, initially attributed to Tibullus. The poems are addressed to Cerinthus. 

Cerinthus was most likely a pseudonym, in the style of the day (like Catullus's Lesbia and Propertius's Cynthia). Cerinthus has sometimes been thought to refer to the Cornutus addressed by Tibullus in two of his Elegies, probably an aristocratic Caecilius Cornutus. The similarity in consonants and the resemblance between the Greek keras ("horn") and Latin cornu (also "horn") are among arguments cited in favour of this identification. Recent criticism, however, has tended away from attempting to identify Cerinthus with an historical figure in favour of noting the literary implications of the pseudonym.

Some critics have challenged the view that the Sulpicia poems were authored by a woman; Thomas Hubbard, Thomas Habinek and Niklas Holzberg have rejected Sulpicia's female authorship by appealing to a purported lack of a female literary culture in ancient Rome. In an overview of Sulpician criticism, Alison Keith described the logic of Hubbard's article as "tortuous" and also highlights problems in Holzberg and Habinek's attempts to efface female authorship. In contrast, Judith P. Hallett argues for increasing the numbers of poems attributed to Sulpicia to include poems 8-12 from the Corpus Tibullianum, which had previously been attributed to an amicus Sulpiciae (friend of Sulpicia).

While academics traditionally regarded Sulpicia as an amateur author, this view was challenged by Santirocco in an article published in 1979, and subsequently the literary merit of this collection of poems has been more fully explored.

Translations
 Perseus Project – Translation by Anne Mahoney
 Poems of Sulpicia I translated, with an Introduction, Notes, and Glossary by Jon Corelis

See also
Sulpicia (gens)
Sulpicia Lepidina
CIL 4.5296

Notes

Further reading
 
 Batstone, W. W. (2018), ‘Sulpicia and the Speech of Men’, in S. Frangoulidis & S. J. Harrison eds, Life, Love and Death in Latin Poetry: Studies in Honor of Theodore D. Papanghelis (Berlin), 101–26.
 Bréguet, E. (1946), Le Roman de Sulpicia: Elégies IV, 2–12 du Corpus Tibullianum (Geneva).
 Currie, H. MacL. (1983), ‘The Poems of Sulpicia’, Aufstieg und Niedergang der römischen Welt 2.30.3: 1751–64.
 Dronke, P. (2003), ‘Alcune osservazioni sulle poesie di Sulpicia (c.a. 25 a.C.)’, in F. Bertini ed. (2003), Giornate filologiche ‘Francesco della Corte’ III (Genoa), 81–99.
 Fabre-Serris, Jacqueline (2017), ‘Sulpicia, Gallus et les élégiaques. Propositions de lecture de l’épigramme 3.13’, Eugesta 7: 115–39. https://eugesta-revue.univ-lille.fr/pdf/2017/4.Fabre-Serris-Eugesta-7_2017.pdf
 Fabre-Serris, Jacqueline (2018), ‘Intratextuality and Intertextuality in the Corpus Tibullianum (3.8–18)’, in S. J. Harrison, S. Frangoulidis & T. Papanghelis eds, Intertextuality and Latin Literature (Berlin & Boston, MA), 67–80.
 Fabre-Serris, J. (2020), ‘The authorship of Tibullus 3.9’, in T. E. Franklinos & L. Fulkerson eds, Constructing Authors and Readers in the Appendices Vergiliana, Tibulliana, and Ouidiana (Oxford), 170–85.
 Fielding, I. (2020), ‘The authorship of Sulpicia’, in T. E. Franklinos & L. Fulkerson eds, Constructing Authors and Readers in the Appendices Vergiliana, Tibulliana, and Ouidiana (Oxford), 186–97.
 Flaschenriem, Barbara L. (2005). "Sulpicia and the Rhetoric of Disclosure". Chapter 9 in Greene, Ellen (ed.) Women Poets in Ancient Greece and Rome. University of Oklahoma Press.
 Fulkerson, L. (2017), A Literary Commentary on the Elegies of the Appendix Tibulliana (Oxford).
 Hallett, Judith Peller (2002), ‘The Eleven Elegies of the Augustan Poet Sulpicia’, in L. J. Churchill, P. R. Brown & J. E. Jeffrey eds, Women Writing Latin: from Roman Antiquity to Early Modern Europe, 3 vv. (New York), 1.45–84.
 Gruppe, O. (1838), Die Römische Elegie (Leipzig).
 Hallett, Judith Peller (2009), ‘Sulpicia and her Resistant Intertextuality’, in D. van Mal-Maeder, A. Burnier & L. Núñez eds, Jeux de voix. Enonciation, intertextualité et intentionnalité dans la littérature antique (Bern, Berlin & Brussels), 141–53.
 Hallett, J. P. (2011), ‘Scenarios of Sulpiciae: Moral Discourses and Immoral Verses’, Eugesta 1: 79–97. https://eugesta-revue.univ-lille.fr/pdf/2011/Hallett.pdf
 Hemelrijk, E. A. (1999), Matrona docta: Educated Women in the Roman Elite from Cornelia to Julia Domna (London).
 Hinds, S. (1987), ‘The Poetess and the Reader: Further Steps towards Sulpicia’, Hermathena 143: 29–46.
 Holzberg, N. (1998–9), ‘Four Poets and a Poetess or a Portrait of the Poet as a Young Man? Thoughts on Book 3 of the Corpus Tibullianum’, Classical Journal 94: 169–91.
 Hubbard, T. K. (2004–05), ‘The Invention of Sulpicia’, Classical Journal 100: 177–94.
 Keith, A. M. (2008), ‘Sartorial Evidence and Poetic Finesse in the Sulpician Corpus’, in J. Edmonson & A. M. Keith eds, Roman Dress and the Fabrics of Roman Culture (Toronto), 192–201.
 Kletke, S. (2016), ‘Why is Sulpicia a Woman?’, Mouseion 13: 625–53.
 Lowe, N. J. (1988), ‘Sulpicia’s Syntax’, Classical Quarterly 38: 193–205.
 Lyne, R. O. A. M. (2007), ‘[Tibullus] Book 3 and Sulpicia’, in idem, Collected Papers in Latin Poetry (Oxford), 341–67.
 Maltby, R. (forthcoming), Corpus Tibullianum III: Text, Translation and Commentary (Newcastle).
 Merriam, Carol U. (2005). "Sulpicia and the Art of Literary Allusion: [Tibullus] 3.13". Chapter 8 in Greene, Ellen (ed.) Women Poets in Ancient Greece and Rome. University of Oklahoma Press
 Milnor, K. (2002), ‘Sulpicia’s (Corpo)reality: Elegy, Authorship, and the Body in [Tibullus] 3.13’, Classical Antitquity 21: 259–82.
 Parker, H. N. (1994), ‘Sulpicia, the auctor de Sulpicia and the Authorship of 3.9 and 3.11 of the Corpus Tibullianum’, Helios 21: 39–62.
 Pearcy, L. T. (2006), ‘Erasing Cerinthus: Sulpicia and her Audience’, Classical World 100: 31–6.
 Santirocco, M. S. (1979), ‘Sulpicia Reconsidered’, Classical Journal 74: 229–39.
 Skoie, Mathilde (2002), Reading Sulpicia: Commentaries 1475–1900 (Oxford).
 Skoie, Mathilde (2012), ‘Corpus Tibullianum, Book 3’, in B. K. Gold ed., A Companion to Roman Love Elegy (Malden, MA & Oxford), 86–100.
 Stevenson, Jane (2005) Women Latin Poets. Language, Gender, and Authority, from Antiquity to the Eighteenth Century (Oxford, 2005), especially ch. 1: "Classical Latin Women Poets" (31-48).
 Tränkle, H. (1990), Appendix Tibulliana (Berlin & New York).

1st-century BC Roman women
1st-century BC Roman poets
Elegiac poets
Ancient Roman women writers
Golden Age Latin writers
1st-century BC Romans
1st-century BC women writers
Sulpicii
Ancient women poets